The LG G Watch R (model W110) is an Android Wear-based smartwatch announced and released by LG and Google on October 25, 2014. It is the second round-faced smartwatch after the Motorola Moto 360 but, unlike the 360, it is the first to feature a full circular display. It is the successor to LG's original LG G Watch, which features a rectangular display.

Hardware
The G Watch R has IP67 certification for dust and water resistance. It has a user-replaceable buckle-based strap. The watch consists of a 1.2 GHz Quad-Core Qualcomm Snapdragon 400 processor, 4GB internal storage and 512MB RAM. It is encased in a brushed aluminum and stainless steel body, which holds on the P-OLED display. The smartwatch has Bluetooth LE connectivity, a barometer for several uses including atmospheric pressure and altitude, an accelerometer, a gyroscope and a heart rate monitor. Wi-Fi connectivity was enabled in an official patch.
While the watch does include a microphone, the lack of a speaker makes it impossible to make calls on it.

References

External links

 
 kids smartwatches

Android (operating system) devices
Products introduced in 2014
Wear OS devices
Smartwatches
LG Electronics products